The Macoupin County miner bee (Andrena macoupinensis) is a species of miner bee in the family Andrenidae. It is found in Central America and North America.

References

Further reading

 
 

macoupinensis